The 2015–16 LPB season was the 83rd season of the premier Portuguese basketball league, and the eight season under the current Liga Portuguesa de Basquetebol (LPB) format. The regular season was played between 10 October 2015 and 17 April May 2016, and was followed by the playoffs between 22 April and 28 May 2016. 

Porto defeated four-time defending champions Benfica 3–1 in the playoff finals to win their 12th national championship title, in the first season after being promoted from the second tier.

Format
A total of eleven teams played a first phase in a double round-robin format, with the odd team resting every matchday. In the second phase, contested in the same system, teams were divided into two groups according to their classification in the previous round: Group A comprised the six best-ranked teams and Group B included the remaining teams. The six teams from Group A and the two best-placed teams from Group B qualified for the playoffs, while the last-placed team from Group B was relegated to the Proliga.

Teams

Due to the withdrawal of Algés, a total of 11 teams will participate in the 2015–16 LPB. The Portuguese Basketball Federation invited each of the teams relegated in the previous season, Illiabum and Sampaense, to take the place left vacant by Algés, but neither accepted. In this way, the top nine teams (excluding Algés) from the 2014–15 LPB will be joined by the top two teams from the 2014–15 Proliga: Porto, who return to the top-tier league after the 2011–12 season, and Eléctrico.

Regular season

First phase

Second phase
In the second phase, teams started their group matches with the results from the matches played against the remaining teams in the same group, during the first phase.

Group A

Group B

Playoffs
The playoffs were contested in three rounds, which included quarter-finals, semi-finals and final. Each round was played under a best-of-five format, in which the team with the highest classification in the second phase had "home advantage" (first, second and fifth matches played at home).

References

External links
FPB website 

Liga Portuguesa de Basquetebol seasons
Portuguese
LPB